The 9th Daytime Emmy Awards were held on Friday, June 11, 1982, to commemorate excellence in daytime programming from the previous year (1981). The telecast aired from 3-4:30 p.m. on CBS, preempting Guiding Light and Tattletales.

Winners in each category are in bold.

Outstanding Daytime Drama Series

All My Children
General Hospital
Guiding Light
Ryan's Hope

Outstanding Actor in a Daytime Drama Series

James Mitchell (Palmer Cortlandt, All My Children)
Richard Shoberg (Tom Cudahy, All My Children)
Larry Bryggman (John Dixon, As the World Turns)
Stuart Damon (Alan Quartermaine, General Hospital)
Anthony Geary (Luke Spencer, General Hospital)

Outstanding Actress in a Daytime Drama Series

Susan Lucci (Erica Kane, All My Children)
Ann Flood (Nancy Pollock, The Edge of Night)
Sharon Gabet (Raven Whitney, The Edge of Night)
Leslie Charleson (Monica Quartermaine, General Hospital)
Robin Strasser (Dorian Lord, One Life to Live)

Outstanding Supporting Actor in a Daytime Drama Series

Darnell Williams (Jesse Hubbard, All My Children)
David Lewis (Edward Quartermaine, General Hospital)
Douglas Sheehan (Joe Kelly, General Hospital)
Gerald Anthony (Marco Dane, One Life to Live)

Outstanding Supporting Actress in a Daytime Drama Series

Elizabeth Lawrence (Myra Sloane, All My Children)
Dorothy Lyman (Opal Cortlandt, All My Children)
Meg Mundy (Mona Croft, The Doctors)
Louise Shaffer (Rae Woodward, Ryan's Hope)

Outstanding Daytime Drama Series Writing

 Guiding Light
 All My Children
 One Life to Live
 The Edge of Night

Outstanding Daytime Drama Series Directing
 All My Children
 General Hospital
 One Life to Live
 The Edge of Night

Outstanding Game Show
Password Plus - A Mark Goodson-Bill Todman Production for NBC
Family Feud - A Mark Goodson-Bill Todman Production for ABC (Syn. by Viacom)
The Price Is Right - A Mark Goodson-Bill Todman Production for CBS
Wheel of Fortune - A Merv Griffin Production for NBC

Outstanding Game Show Host
Bob Barker (The Price Is Right)
Bill Cullen (Blockbusters)
Richard Dawson (Family Feud)

External links

009
Daytime Emmy Awards